Claudine is a 2010 Philippine television drama anthology broadcast by GMA Network. Starring Claudine Barretto, it premiered on April 10, 2010 replacing BandaOke! Rock 'N Roll to Millions. The show concluded on August 7, 2010 with a total of 18 episodes.

Episodes

Ratings
According to AGB Nielsen Philippines' Mega Manila household television ratings, the pilot episode of Claudine earned a 16.6% rating. While the final episode scored a 9.2% rating in Mega Manila People/Individual television ratings.

References

External links
 

2010 Philippine television series debuts
2010 Philippine television series endings
Filipino-language television shows
GMA Network original programming
Philippine anthology television series